The 1991 Lagos State gubernatorial election occurred on 14 December 1991. NRC candidate Michael Otedola won the election.

Conduct
The gubernatorial election was conducted using an open ballot system. Primaries for the two parties to select their flag bearers were conducted on 19 October 1991.

The election occurred on 14 December 1991. NRC candidate Michael Otedola won the election.

References 

Gubernatorial election 1991
December 1991 events in Nigeria
Lag